Dame Lorna Elizabeth Muirhead  (née Fox) is a past President of the Royal College of Midwives and from 2006 until her retirement in 2017 she served as the Lord Lieutenant of Merseyside.

In 1992 she became a member of the Council of the Royal College of Midwives (RCM) and, in 1997, was elected as President. She served two terms of office, until 2004. Throughout this time she continued to work as a clinical midwife.

During her presidency she represented the RCM in, among other venues:  
 Council of the Royal College of Obstetricians and Gynaecologists (RCOG)
 Joint RCM/RCOG committee
 Standing Nursing and Midwifery Advisory Committee (SNMAC)
 Women's National Commission
 Council of the International Confederation of Midwives
 Specialist Register of the English National Board
 Benevolent Fund Committee of the Royal College of Midwives Trust
 Council of the Kings Fund
 National Service Framework for Midwifery

Other affiliations
Muirhead was a midwifery adviser on Baby Lifeline; a member of the Council of the Liverpool School of Tropical Medicine; national midwifery adviser for St John Ambulance; and served as Lord Lieutenant of Merseyside.

She is also currently (June 2011) President of Merseyside County Scout Council, a County of The Scout Association in the United Kingdom. Dame Lorna is a long-standing Co-President (with eminent obstetrician Professor James Drife) of the national charity Baby Lifeline. She is also a Patron of the Birkenhead Choral Society. She is an Honorary member of The Rotary Club of Birkenhead.

Personal details
She is married to Ronald Muirhead. The couple has a son and a daughter.

Honours
 She was appointed Dame Commander of the Order of the British Empire (DBE) in 2000 for her services to midwifery. 
 In 2001, she became a fellow of the RCOG and was made an Honorary Fellow of Liverpool's John Moores University the same year. In 2004 she received the inaugural award from the RCM for her lifetime achievement in midwifery. 
 She was appointed Dame Commander of the Royal Victorian Order (DCVO) in the 2017 New Year Honours for her services as Lord Lieutenant of Merseyside.

References

External links
Rosie conference 2002
Lord Lieutenant of Merseyside
 

Living people
Commanders of the Order of St John
Dames Commander of the Order of the British Empire
British midwives
People in health professions from Merseyside
Lord-Lieutenants of Merseyside
Year of birth missing (living people)
Place of birth missing (living people)
Dames Commander of the Royal Victorian Order
Double dames